The district of Bellechasse was established in 1829, under the regime of the Constitutional Act of 1791.  It was located in the current Chaudière-Appalaches area.

Bellechasse was represented simultaneously by two Members at the Legislative Assembly of Lower Canada.

Members of the Parliament of Lower Canada
Augustin-Norbert Morin & Nicolas Boissonnault (1830–1841)

See also
Bellechasse (electoral district in Canada East)
Bellechasse (Quebec provincial electoral district)
Bellechasse (Canadian federal electoral district)

Electoral districts of Lower Canada
1829 establishments in Lower Canada
1838 disestablishments in Lower Canada
Constituencies established in 1829
Constituencies disestablished in 1838